Futile Sessions is a half-live, half-studio album by Elephant Micah. It was released on Micah's own LRRC label in 2005 for sale on Micah's fall tour.

Track listing
Psychic Guitar Knowledge
Help Me Carry This Piano
Some Naive Hummingbirds
Cloverleaf Wars
Lake Secret/Melody In
(Untitled Track)
Remember the M Year (live)
Sawed In Two (live)
Unairconditioned Instrumental (live)
TV-Like Slow Motion (live)
Put To Bed (Live)
Turned Up to Stardom (ending- live)

References

Elephant Micah albums
2005 albums